Masson may refer to:

Places
 Masson (electoral district), a Quebec provincial electoral district
 Masson Island, an Antarctic island
 Masson Range, a mountain range in Antarctica

Other uses
 Masson (surname)
 Masson (publisher), a French publisher of scientific books
 Masson Hall, the first "proper" hall of residence for women attending the University of Edinburgh, now closed

See also

 Paul Masson Mountain Winery
 Masson-Angers, Quebec, a sector of the city of Gatineau, Quebec, Canada
 Macon (disambiguation)
 Mason (disambiguation)
 Marson (disambiguation)